The Sri Lanka T-Cup is a multi-day cycling race in Sri Lanka. The race was created as an amateur event in 2017, and was upgraded to the UCI Asia Tour in category 2.2 in 2018.

The event for 2019 was canceled due to the 2019 Sri Lanka Easter bombings.

Winners

References

External links
 

Cycle races in Sri Lanka
UCI Asia Tour races
Recurring sporting events established in 2017
2017 establishments in Sri Lanka